The Philippines men's national 3x3 team represents the country in international 3x3 basketball matches and is governed by the Samahang Basketbol ng Pilipinas''.

History
When 3x3 was held at the 2007 Asian Indoor Games as a demonstration sports the Philippine national team finished fourth with Hong Kong defeating them in the third place play-off. Luigi Trillo was the coach that guided national team composing of Nico Salva, Ryan Buenafe, Arvie Bringas and Clark Bautista, in the games.

The Philippines also participated in the 2010 Youth Summer Olympics in Singapore, the first edition of the Youth Olympics where 3x3 is among the sports contested. The national team finished ninth.

By the virtue of the Philippines' FIBA 3x3 Federation Ranking, the national team qualified for the 2016 FIBA 3x3 World Championships and made their debut in the tournament. They lost 2 and win 2 of their four matches.

The national team played their second stint in the world championships, now renamed as the FIBA 3x3 World Cup in 2018 which was hosted at home in Bocaue. This time the Philippine national team composed of professional players and Bounty Agro Ventures, the owners of Chooks-to-Go and sponsor of the national team and tournament, pledged unspecified monetary reward for the Philippine national team for each game won. Like in 2016, they lost half of their four matches (to Mongolia and Canada) but won over Brazil and Russia which were ranked fifth and third respectively. The team which is composed of players who typically plays the full 5-a-side basketball cited its experience in 3x3 for its finishing.

The Samahang Basketbol ng Pilipinas (SBP), the country's national association, planned to come up with a road map to help the Philippines qualify a team in 3x3 basketball in the 2020 Summer Olympics following the national team's stint in the 2018 FIBA 3x3 World Cup. The SBP planned to create a pool of players dedicated to the 3x3 variant of basketball. The SBP, along with private sponsor Chooks-to-Go, started the process in August 2018 with the launch of a national tour to help scout for players across the country.

The SBP managed to help the Philippine men's national team secure a berth in the Olympic Qualifying Tournament (OQT) for the 2020 Summer Olympics via the world rankings. The Chooks-to-Go Pilipinas 3x3 league and the Manok ng Bayan–SBP 3X3 youth tournament to help raise enough world ranking points for the Philippine men's national team to qualify a spot in the OQT. Serbians Stefan Stojavic and Darko Krsman were tasked to help prepare the Philippines for their OQT bid.

Roster
This is the roster for the 2022 FIBA 3x3 Asia Cup.

Senior competitions

World Cup

Asia Cup

Asian Indoor Games

3x3 in the 2007 edition was a demonstration sport.

Southeast Asian Games

Youth competitions

U18 World Championships

Youth Olympics

Asian Games

Asian Youth Games

Asia U18 Cup

See also
Philippines at the FIBA 3x3 World Tour - for teams that represented cities such as Manila North and Manila West.
Philippines women's national 3x3 team

References